Arthur Dale Rothrock (January 7, 1886 – November 28, 1938) was an American sport shooter who competed in the 1920 Summer Olympics.

In 1920 he won the gold medal as member of the American team in the team small-bore rifle competition and the silver medal in the individual small-bore rifle. He also participated in the 300 metre military rifle, standing event but his place is unknown.

He was born in Hancock County, Ohio and died in Ada, Ohio.

References

External links
profile

1886 births
1938 deaths
American male sport shooters
United States Distinguished Marksman
ISSF rifle shooters
Shooters at the 1920 Summer Olympics
Olympic gold medalists for the United States in shooting
Olympic silver medalists for the United States in shooting
People from Hancock County, Ohio
Medalists at the 1920 Summer Olympics
19th-century American people
20th-century American people